Harper is an unincorporated community on the South Branch Potomac River in Pendleton County, West Virginia, United States. Harper is located along U.S. Route 220.

References

Unincorporated communities in Pendleton County, West Virginia
Unincorporated communities in West Virginia